Calhoun County is a county located in the U.S. state of Iowa. As of the 2020 census, the population was 9,927. Its county seat is Rockwell City.

History

Calhoun County was formed on January 15, 1851 from open land originally named Fox County. It was renamed in 1853 after the seventh US Vice President secessionist John C. Calhoun. When the tracks of the 
Illinois Central Railroad were laid through the county in 1870, the county seat was moved from Lake City to Rockwell City.  The first train reached Rockwell City on August 7, 1882 and the population count doubled in the same year.  The first courthouse, built of wood, burned to the ground in 1884 and the county government moved into a nearby hotel.  In 1913, the current courthouse was built.

On July 6, 1893, Pomeroy was struck by a tornado that measured F5 on the Fujita scale. The tornado killed 71 people and injured 200.

Geography

Ecology
Calhoun County is located entirely within the Des Moines Lobe of the Western Corn Belt Plains ecoregion, as defined by the United States Environmental Protection Agency (EPA). One of the flattest regions in Iowa, the Des Moines Lobe ecoregion is a distinctive area naturally defined by Wisconsin glaciation but modified by humans for extensive agriculture. In general, the land is level to gently rolling with some areas of relief defined by glacial features like moraines, hummocky knobs, and kettles, and outwash deposits. The lobe does not have any loess deposits like the Loess Hills to the west.

The stream network is poorly developed and widely spaced, with major rivers carving valleys that are relatively deep and steep-sided. Almost all of the natural lakes of Iowa are found in the northern part of this region (the Iowa Great Lakes). Most of the region has been converted from wet prairie to agricultural use with substantial surface water drainage. Only a small fraction of the wetlands remain, and many natural lakes have been drained as a result of agricultural drainage projects via drainage tiles or ditches.

Major highways
 U.S. Highway 20
 Iowa Highway 4
 Iowa Highway 7
 Iowa Highway 175

Adjacent counties
Pocahontas County  (north)
Webster County  (east)
Greene County  (southeast)
Carroll County  (southwest)
Sac County  (west)

Demographics

2020 census
There were 4,771 housing units of which 4,070 were occupied.

2010 census
There were 5,108 housing units, of which 4,242 were occupied.

2000 census

As of the census of 2000, there were 11,115 people, 4,513 households, and 3,014 families residing in the county.  The population density was 20 people per square mile (8/km2).  There were 5,219 housing units at an average density of 9 per square mile (4/km2).  The racial makeup of the county was 98.06% White, 0.69% Black or African American, 0.20% Native American, 0.18% Asian, 0.01% Pacific Islander, 0.34% from other races, and 0.52% from two or more races.  0.90% of the population were Hispanic or Latino of any race.

There were 4,513 households, out of which 27.80% had children under the age of 18 living with them, 57.90% were married couples living together, 6.60% had a female householder with no husband present, and 33.20% were non-families. 30.50% of all households were made up of individuals, and 17.80% had someone living alone who was 65 years of age or older.  The average household size was 2.31 and the average family size was 2.87.

In the county, the population was spread out, with 23.10% under the age of 18, 6.40% from 18 to 24, 24.80% from 25 to 44, 23.70% from 45 to 64, and 22.10% who were 65 years of age or older.  The median age was 42 years. For every 100 females there were 98.10 males.  For every 100 females age 18 and over, there were 97.60 males.

The median income for a household in the county was $33,286, and the median income for a family was $41,583. Males had a median income of $28,787 versus $20,095 for females. The per capita income for the county was $17,498.  10.10% of the population and 7.10% of families were below the poverty line.  Out of the total population, 13.50% of those under the age of 18 and 8.50% of those 65 and older were living below the poverty line.

Communities

Cities

Farnhamville
Jolley
Knierim
Lake City
Lohrville
Lytton
Manson
Pomeroy
Rinard
Rockwell City
Somers
Yetter

Unincorporated communities
Easley
Knoke
Sherwood
Twin Lakes, a census-designated place

Townships
Calhoun County is divided into sixteen townships:

 Butler
 Calhoun
 Cedar
 Center
 Elm Grove
 Garfield
 Greenfield
 Jackson
 Lake Creek
 Lincoln
 Logan
 Reading
 Sherman
 Twin Lakes
 Union
 Williams

Population ranking
The population ranking of the following table is based on the 2020 census of Calhoun County.

† county seat

Politics
Politically, Calhoun County has favoured the Republicans since 1896, usually only voting Democrat when the party won national victories. It first voted for the Democrats in 1932 when Franklin D. Roosevelt won in a landslide victory against Herbert Hoover. In 2000, Calhoun County voted for George W. Bush and has voted for the Republicans ever since. In 2016 Donald Trump won 67.2% percent of the vote in Calhoun County, the highest vote share since Dwight D. Eisenhower’s victory in 1952.

See also

National Register of Historic Places listings in Calhoun County, Iowa
Calhoun County Courthouse

References

External links

County website
Graphic-Advocate Newspaper

 
1855 establishments in Iowa
Populated places established in 1855